Aiken High School may refer to:

Aiken High School (Aiken, South Carolina)
Aiken High School (Cincinnati, Ohio)
South Aiken High School, Aiken, South Carolina